The following is a list of Celtic musicians.

British Isles

Cornwall
Brenda Wootton

Northumberland
Kathryn Tickell

Ireland

Altan
The Bothy Band
Celtic Women
The Chieftains
Clannad
The Corrs
Danú
De Dannan
Enya
Na Fili
Horslips
Hothouse Flowers
Planxty
Wolfe Tones

Scotland
Alasdair Fraser
The Battlefield Band
Martyn Bennett
The Boys of the Lough
Capercaillie
Johnny Cunningham
Phil Cunningham
Dougie MacLean
Tannahill Weavers
Silly Wizard

Wales
Ar Log
Fernhill
Dafydd Iwan
Sian James
Carreg Lafar
Julie Murphy
Meic Stevens

Continental Europe

France (Breton)
Jackie Molard (violinist) 
Christian Lemaitre (violinist)
Nolwenn Leroy
Alan Stivell (Celtic harpist)
Kornog

Poland
Carrantuohill
Shannon
Stonehenge
Beltaine

Serbia
Orthodox Celts
Irish Stew of Sindidun

North America

Canada
Irene Bridger
Great Big Sea
Mary Jane Lamond
Leahy
Ashley MacIsaac
Buddy MacMaster
Natalie MacMaster
Loreena McKennitt
The Rankin Family
Rawlins Cross
Spirit of the West

United States
Black 47
Brobdingnagian Bards
Celtic Thunder
Culann's Hounds
Cherish the Ladies
Sue Draheim
Séamus Egan
Marc Gunn
Solas

See also
:Category:Irish folk musical groups

Further reading
Sawyers, June Skinner (2000). Celtic Music: a complete guide. Da Capo Press. .

Celtic
List